HMS Howe was built as a 121-gun screw first-rate ship of the line of the Royal Navy. She and her sister HMS Victoria were the first and only British three-decker ships of the line to be designed from the start for screw propulsion, but the Howe was never completed for sea service (and never served under her original name).  During the 1860s, the first ironclad battleships gradually made unarmoured two- and three-deckers obsolete.

The highest number of guns she ever actually carried was 12, when she finally entered service as the training ship Bulwark in 1885.

Howe was named after Admiral Richard Howe. She was renamed a second time to Impregnable on 27 September 1886, but reverted to Bulwark in 1919 shortly before being sold for breaking up in 1921. The timbers were used to refurbish in the Tudor revivalist style the interior and fascia of the Liberty Store in London.

References

Ships of the line of the Royal Navy
1860 ships